Pic de Costa Cabirolera is a mountain of Catalonia, Spain.

Mountains of Catalonia